Rakov may refer to:

People
 Aleksandr Rakov (born 1945), a Russian football player and coach
 Maxim Rakov (born 1986), a wrestler from Kazakhstan
 Nikolai Rakov (1908-1990), a Soviet composer
 Zapryan Rakov (born 1962), a  Bulgarian football player

Places
Rakaŭ, a village in Belarus known in Russian as Rakov
Rakov (Přerov District), a village in the Czech Republic

See also
 Rakow (disambiguation)